Darker Days is second studio album by the American street punk band Time Again. It was recorded in Los Angeles, California and released on February 19, 2008 via Hellcat Records.

Track listing
Tracklist adapted from iTunes

Personnel
 Daniel Dart - vocals, cover art
 Elijah Reyes - guitar
 Oren Soffer - bass
 Ryan Purucker - drums
 Mike Green - mixing, producer
 Gene Grimaldi - mastering

References

External links 

2008 albums
Time Again albums